The Smithville Public School Building is a historic school building on Arkansas Highway 117 in the small community of Smithville, Arkansas.  It is a single-story T-shaped fieldstone structure with a cross-gable roof.

History 
It was built in 1936 with funding from the Works Progress Administration in an attempt to bolster the community's economy, which had been affected by the Great Depression, and by the loss of its status as county seat when Sharp County was separated from Lawrence County.

In the 1980s, the building was in poor condition, so state legislators distributed 140,000 dollars to repair the building.

The building was listed on the National Register of Historic Places on January 11, 1993. It now functions as a fire station.

See also
National Register of Historic Places listings in Lawrence County, Arkansas

References

School buildings on the National Register of Historic Places in Arkansas
Buildings and structures in Lawrence County, Arkansas
School buildings completed in 1936
National Register of Historic Places in Lawrence County, Arkansas